Maarit Helena Hurmerinta (born in Helsinki on 10 November 1953) is a Finnish singer and musician. She is better known by her mononym Maarit. Maarit is the granddaughter of Italian musician Michele Orlando. Maarit's daughter Janna Hurmerinta is also a singer known by her mononym Janna.

Discography

Albums
Studio albums
1973: Maarit
1975: Viis' pientä
1978: Siivet saan
1980: Nykyajan lapsi
1981: Elämän maku
1983: Nukun radio päällä
1986: Tuuli ja taivas
1988: Tuskan tanssi
1990: Jotain on mulla mielessäni
1993: Jos tahdot tietää

Live albums

Compilation albums

References

External links
Official website

20th-century Finnish women singers
1953 births
Living people
Finnish people of Italian descent
Singers from Helsinki